La Pocatière station is a Via Rail station in La Pocatière, Quebec, Canada. It is located on Avenue de la Gare. The station is staffed and offers limited wheelchair accessibility. La Pocatière is served by Via Rail's Ocean; the Montreal – Gaspé train was suspended in 2013. Both trains share the same rail line between Montreal and Matapédia.

The station is recognized as a Heritage Railway Station by the Federal government and has a citation by municipality of Sainte-Anne-de-la-Pocatière, listed on the Quebec Cultural Heritage Directory.

References

External links

Via Rail page for the Ocean
Via Rail page for the Montreal – Gaspé train

Via Rail stations in Quebec
Railway stations in Bas-Saint-Laurent
Grand Trunk Railway stations in Quebec
La Pocatière